The Super Bowl XLI halftime show took place on February 4, 2007 at Dolphin Stadium in Miami Florida as part of Super Bowl XLI. It was headlined by Prince.

Background and development
The executive producer of the show was Don Mischer. Mischer's company, Mischer Productions, was the executive producer and director. White Cherry Entertainment, run by Ricky Kirshner and Glenn Weiss, were also executive producers. The production designer was Bruce Rogers. Mischner Productions and White Cherry Entertainment had earlier signed an agreement to produce marquee events, like the entertainment surrounding the NFL Kickoff Game, throughout the 2006 NFL season. 

For the first time, Pepsi was the sponsor of the halftime show. They would return to sponsoring halftime shows with Super Bowl XLVII. 

After having, in the past, been uninterested in performing in a Super Bowl halftime show, in 2006, Prince expressed interest. Executives that were in charge of booking an act for the halftime show visited Prince in Los Angeles. During this meeting, Prince and three members of his backing band New Power Generation performed for the executives, which convinced the executives that he would be the proper act to perform at the upcoming Super Bowl's halftime show. He was announced as the performer on December 10. 

In late 2006, representatives of Prince reached out to Julian White, the director of the Florida A&M University, and managed to get the band to agree to performing in the show. The involvement of the marching band was largely kept a secret, with New Power Generation keyboardist Morris Hayes having later shared that he did not know of their inclusion until the first rehearsal that included them. Members of the marching band were not told themselves until roughly a month before the show that they would be performing in the halftime show. 

One of the ideas Mischer contributed was to have the marching band adorned with illuminated tape, so that would be more visible.

One of the centerpiece visual effects utilized involved projecting Prince's silhouette onto a large screen that he stood behind. Air was utilized to make the screen stand erect. This effect was one that Don Mischer had first utilized for the 1996 Summer Olympics opening ceremony.

Much of Prince's rehearsals were in the city of Las Vegas, where Prince had a residency show. They used tape to outline the shape of the stage, as they did not have the actual stage available to them for their Las Vegas rehearsals. In the days before the show, Prince and his band rehearsed in a tent adjacent to the stadium. Prince and his supporting performers only had a single rehearsal on the stadium's field.

During his pre-performance joint press conference with national anthem performer Billy Joel, which halftime and national anthem performers conventionally hold, rather than taking questions, Prince gave the press a mini-concert.

Hundreds of volunteers helped to assemble and disassemble the stage. During the stage setup, volunteers accidentally ran over a power cable with a rolling part of the stage. A member of the lighting crew responded to the issue by holding the severed ends of the cable in place with his hands for the entire duration of the show.

Weather
The weather during the game had been rainy, and this inclement weather continued into Prince's performance, which took place during a downpour. This was the first occasion in which it rained during a Super Bowl halftime show. There was potential hazard due to the material the stage was made of, as it gets slippery when wet, and, adding to the risk, Prince and his dancers were wearing high-heeled shoes. Further hazard was that electric guitars were used.

Prince is said to have reveled in the weather, with some involved in the show later reporting that Prince asked if the show-runners could "make it rain harder".

Synopsis
The show was approximately 12 minutes in duration. Prince wore a turquoise suit and had a durag in over hair. He performed on a large stage shaped like his signature "love symbol". The edges of the stage had neon lighting. During the show, he was accompanied by his backing band New Power Generation. He was also accompanied by the duo "The Twinz", which consisted of identical twins Maya and Nandy McClean, who had previously toured with Prince. Additionally, for some songs, he was further accompanied by the Florida A&M University Marching 100 Band. The marching band had their uniforms adorned with illuminated tape.

The performance began with an intro featuring the song "We Will Rock You." Fireworks were launched during this intro, and lighting effects simulating lightning were also utilized. Prince then came on stage, rising via a stage elevator, and performed his hit song "Let's Go Crazy". During this song, Prince included an ad-libbed call and response from the crowd.

Now joined by the Florida A&M University Marching 100 Band, he performed a medley of his songs "Baby I'm a Star" and "1999" and the Creedence Clearwater Revival song "Proud Mary".

He then performed a medley of Bob Dylan's song "All Along the Watchtower" and the  Foo Fighters' song "Best of You". For these songs, the marching band's instruments were not utilized.

As the final song of the performance, he performed his own hit "Purple Rain". The marching band again instrumentally accompanied him for the song. During the song's guitar solo, Prince played his guitar positioned behind a screen that had risen from under the stage, having his silhouette projected onto the screen. Because of the inclement weather and the nature of the lighting effects, a portion of the performance appeared to take place during a literal "purple rain." Fireworks were again launched at the end of the song.

Critical reception
The performance was widely acclaimed. Kelefa Sanneh, of The New York Times, wrote that the performance would "surely go down as one of the most thrilling halftime shows ever; certainly the most unpredictable, and perhaps the best." Mark Caro, of the Chicago Tribune, wrote that Prince's performance, "for once, justified the existence of a mini-concert sandwiched between halves of football." Many have opined that the rainy weather actually added to the performance, especially during Prince's rendition of "Purple Rain".

Numerous outlets have retrospectively ranked the performance the best Super Bowl halftime show performance. Further outlets have ranked it among the best.

Commercial reception
Prince's physical album sales increased to 31,000 in the week after his performance, as compared to 14,000 the week before. According to SoundScan, his digital sales increased to 102,000 in the week after his performance, as compared to the 59,000 the week prior. Additionally, his sales on Amazon increased 700%.

Setlist
 "We Will Rock You" (Intro)
 "Let's Go Crazy"
 "Baby I'm a Star"/"Proud Mary"/"1999"
 "All Along the Watchtower"/"Best of You"
 "Purple Rain"

Controversy
There was some controversy that, during a portion of the show where Prince was silhouetted onto a screen, the placement of his guitar was phallic. The Smoking Gun reported that in excess of 150 people had complained to the FCC about the Super Bowl broadcast, with the majority of complaints being about either this or a Snickers commercial which featured two men kissing.

References

2007 in American music
2007 in Texas
Prince (musician)
041
Television controversies in the United States
February 2007 sports events in the United States
2007 in sports in Texas